General elections were held in Luxembourg on 14 October 2018. All 60 seats of the Chamber of Deputies were renewed.

The incumbent Bettel–Schneider Ministry was made up of a coalition of the Democratic Party (DP), the Luxembourg Socialist Workers' Party (LSAP) and The Greens. The largest party in Parliament, the Christian Social People's Party (CSV), was in the opposition. The 2018 election allowed for the coalition to remain in place with minor changes in government composition.

Date
There was some debate about when the election ought to be held. Article 56 of the Constitution of Luxembourg defines that deputies are elected for a five-year term, which would mean holding an election by October 2018, five years after the 20 October 2013 snap election. However, article 123 of the Electoral Law of 2003 states that "In case of dissolution of the Chamber, the end of tenure dates for deputies elected after the dissolution, will occur in the year following the opening of the fifth ordinary session." Since the fifth ordinary session would be opened in late 2018, the election would need to be held in 2019, likely concurrent with the June 2019 European Parliament elections, exceeding the constitutional five-year term. The electoral law was thus seen as conflicting with the constitution, and the politicians intended to amend the law and hold general elections in October 2018. The law modification of 15 December 2017 removes June as month for regular parliamentary elections and instead fixes the election date when the parliamentary term expires, meaning five years after the previous election.

Electoral system

The 60 members of the Chamber of Deputies was elected by proportional representation in four multi-member constituencies; 9 in North constituency, 7 in East, 23 in South and 21 in Centre. Voters could vote for a party list or cast multiple votes for as many candidates as there are seats. Seat allocation is calculated in accordance with the Hagenbach-Bischoff quota.

Only Luxembourg citizens may vote in general elections. A proposal to extend voting rights to foreigners who have lived in Luxembourg for at least 10 years and have previously voted in a European or local election in Luxembourg, was decisively rejected in a 2015 referendum. Voting is mandatory for eligible Luxembourg citizens who live in Luxembourg and are under 75 years of age. Luxembourg citizens who live abroad may vote by post at the commune in which they most recently lived in Luxembourg. Luxembourg citizens who were born in Luxembourg but have never lived there may vote by post at the commune in which they were born. Luxembourg citizens who were not born in Luxembourg and have never lived there may vote by post at the commune of Luxembourg City.

Campaign
On 2 March 2018, the Alternative Democratic Reform Party (ADR) announced an electoral alliance with the Wee 2050-Nee 2015 movement, which had formed itself as a citizen's movement fighting for the "3 x no" in the 2015 referendum. This agreement gives the movement up to eight slots on the ADR's lists.

Opinion polls

Parties
The following parties contested the election.

Results

Aftermath
On 16 October Grand Duke Henri gave Xavier Bettel the task of forming the next government, with the DP, LSAP and DG announcing that they would participate in coalition talks. On 17 October coalition negotiations started between the three parties, with an agreement due to be finished before Christmas. It was expected that the LSAP would take the EU Commission post in the next government, while the DG would increase their influence on ministries. The coalition was confirmed and Bettel was reappointed Prime Minister on 5 December 2018.

References

Luxembourg
2018 in Luxembourg
Chamber of Deputies (Luxembourg) elections
October 2018 events in Europe